The USPSA Multigun Championship, formerly called the 3-Gun Nationals, are yearly multigun championships held by the United States Practical Shooting Association (USPSA). The Multigun Championship is always held at a separate range and date from the pistol nationals USPSA Handgun Championship and IPSC US Handgun Championship. Currently, anyone can participate in the Multigun Championship on a first-come, first-served basis.

History 

The inaugural USPSA Multigun Championship was held in 1990 at the Pike-Adams Sportsmen's Alliance (PASA) in Barry, Illinois.

List of championships
 1990 Pike-Adams Sportsmen's Alliance (PASA) in Barry, Illinois
 1991
 1992
 1993
 1994
 1995
 1996
 1997
 1998
 1999
 2000 
 2001 
 2002 
 2003 
 2004 September, Pike-Adams Sportsmen's Alliance (PASA) in Barry, Illinois
 2005 
 2006 July 27–30, Bend Albany, Oregon
 2007 October 4–7, U.S. Shooting Academy (USSA) in Tulsa, Oklahoma
 2008 October 3–5, Princeton, Louisiana
 2009 October 22–25 Boulder City, Nevada
 2010 September 10–12, Las Vegas, Nevada
 2011 October 20–23, Las Vegas, Nevada
 2012 April 11–15, Las Vegas, Nevada
 2013 April 24, Las Vegas, Nevada
 2014 April 17–20, Las Vegas, Nevada
 2015 April 24–26, Las Vegas, Nevada
 2016 April 13–17, Las Vegas, Nevada
 2017 April 14–16, Boulder City, Nevada
 2018 April 18–22, Boulder City, Nevada
 2019 April 3–7, Universal Shooting Academy in Frostproof, Florida.
 2020 June, Universal Shooting Academy in Frostproof, Florida.
 2022 March, Clinton House range in Clinton, South Carolina.

Champions

The following is a list of current and past USPSA Multigun Champions.

Overall category

Lady category

See also
 USPSA Handgun Championship
 IPSC US Handgun Championship
 IPSC Handgun World Shoots

References

External links 
 List of previous champions

Handgun shooting sports
Rifle shooting sports
Shotgun shooting sports